The Catonsville Nine were nine Catholic activists who burned draft files to protest the Vietnam War. On May 17, 1968, they took 378 draft files from the draft board office in Catonsville, Maryland and burned them in the parking lot.

List of the Nine

The Nine were: 
Father Philip Berrigan, a Josephite priest 
Father Daniel Berrigan, a Jesuit priest
Br. David Darst, a De La Salle Christian Brother 
John Hogan
Tom Lewis, an artist 
Marjorie Bradford Melville, a former Maryknoll sister
Thomas Melville, a former Maryknoll priest
George Mische
Mary Moylan

History
George Mische and Father Phil Berrigan were prime organizers of the Catonsville Nine. The organizing process was very democratic, with interminable meetings and "who's in, who's out" handraisings.

1967 Custom House raid
On October 17, 1967, Fr. Philip Berrigan and Tom Lewis raided the Baltimore City Custom House and poured blood on draft records as part of "The Baltimore Four" (with David Eberhardt and James Mengel) and were out on bail when they burned the records at Catonsville. (The first documented action against draft files is reputed to have been by Barry Bondhus in Minnesota, who, along with other family members, carried human waste into a draft board and defaced draft records.)

1968 Catonsville incident
On May 17, 1968, the Nine went to the Catonsville office of the Selective Service on Frederick Road. They restrained an employee while gathering records into wire bins, One SSS employee, Mary Murphy, attempted to save the draft records but was restrained by one of the Nine. They then took the bins to the parking lot and set fire to them. They then recited the Lord's Prayer and explained to news crews that they were protesting the Vietnam war. Three hundred and seventy-eight draft records were destroyed.

Baltimore County police officers arrested the nine. While they were in jail, the group sent an apologetic letter and a basket of flowers to the clerk on duty at the office during the event.

The Catonsville Nine were tried in federal court October 5–9, 1968, defended by William Kunstler. They were found guilty of destruction of U.S. property, destruction of Selective Service files, and interference with the Selective Service Act of 1967. They were also sentenced to a total of 18 years in jail and fined $22,000. Mary Moylan, Philip Berrigan, Daniel Berrigan and George Mische failed to report for the beginning of their sentences. Daniel Berrigan caused considerable embarrassment to FBI by giving sermons at various events while a fugitive.

Aftermath
Tom Lewis had been sentenced to six years for a prior protest one week after Catonsville, and had three and a half years added to be served concurrently. Fr. Daniel Berrigan was convicted and sentenced to three years in prison to begin on April 9, 1970.  According to Anke Wessels, director of Cornell's Center for Religion, Ethics, and Social Policy, "On the very day he was scheduled to begin his prison term, he left his office keys on a secretary's desk in Anabel Taylor Hall and disappeared." Cornell marked Berrigan's impending imprisonment by conducting a weekend-long "America Is Hard to Find" event April 17–19, 1970, which included a public appearance by the then-fugitive Berrigan before a crowd of 15,000 in Barton Hall.  On August 11, 1970, the FBI found and arrested Berrigan at the home of William Stringfellow and Anthony Towne. He was released from prison in 1972. Lewis was released in 1971.

The "Nine" inspired many other anti-draft and anti-military actions in the 1960s and 1970s,  including the Milwaukee 14, D.C. 9, Silver Spring 3, Chicago 8, Harrisburg 7, Camden 28. Participants sometimes remained at the scene to be arrested, sometimes they departed in order to avoid arrest. It is unknown how many persons were not drafted because of these actions.

 the movement had morphed into a continuing movement with an emphasis on nuclear weapons. The so-called "Plowshares" actions, along with the Catonsville Nine and earlier actions, have been detailed online by Jonah House.

In popular culture

A book A Chronology of Plowshares Disarmament Actions (1980–2003) was compiled by Arthur Laffin.
The Catonsville Nine and Baltimore Four were the subject of the 2013 documentary Hit & Stay by Joe Tropea and Skizz Cyzyk.
The 1971 play The Trial of The Catonsville Nine—Gordon Davidson, director
The 1972 film The Trial of The Catonsville Nine—Gordon Davidson, director; Gregory Peck, producer
A documentary film, Holy Outlaw, about Daniel Berrigan—exists only on 16 mm.
A documentary about the "Plowshares 8"—In the King of Prussia by Emile d'Antonio
A documentary film about the event, Investigation of a Flame, was produced in 2001 by the filmmaker Lynne Sachs.
The Chairman Dances' song "Catonsville 9 (Thomas and Marjorie)", in which “Thomas and Marjorie are depicted on their drive to Catonsville with homemade napalm on their laps, imagining their marriage in and after prison.”
Dar Williams's song, "I Had No Right", from her album The Green World, is about the trial of the Catonsville Nine.
Adrienne Rich's poem "The Burning of Paper Instead of Children" makes numerous references to the Catonsville Nine and includes an epigraph from Daniel Berrigan during the trial ("I was in danger of verbalizing my moral impulses out of existence").
The song "War No More" describes the draft action of the Catonsville Nine. It was composed by Joe DeFilippo and recorded and performed by the R.J. Phillips Band.
The Chip Taylor song  "Nine Soldiers In Baltimore", an inspirational account

The Trial of the Catonsville Nine (play)
Fr. Daniel Berrigan wrote a play in free verse, The Trial of the Catonsville Nine, about the trial. The version performed is usually an adaptation into regular dialogue by Saul Levitt. The play is based on a partial transcript of the trial.

In 1972 a film version of the play was produced by Gregory Peck. It cost $300,000 and Peck "lost every penny".

In 2009, it was presented on a tour by a company called "the Actors' Gang" of Culver City, California, founded by film star Tim Robbins.

The Trial and Prison (portfolio)
In 1969, while briefly released on appeal, Tom Lewis published a portfolio of etchings he made while imprisoned at Lewisburg Federal Penitentiary. It contains ten etchings, in a run of fifty copies, some printed with ink he had to scrounge together from ashes, coffee or cocoa powder. He wrote accompanying text and the cover was printed by fellow Catholic activist Corita Kent. The etchings depict the psychic torment of his fellow prisoners by suicidal thoughts, boredom or isolation, as well as scenes of police brutality.

See also
 Protests of 1968

References

Further reading
 Berrigan, Daniel. The Trial of the Catonsville Nine. Boston: Beacon Press, 1970.
 Harrison, Dorothy Lilja (2010). Peace, Be Still.  
 Peters, Shawn Francis. The Catonsville Nine: A Story of Faith and Resistance in the Vietnam Era. New York: Oxford University Press, 2012.
 Polner, Murray -Disarmed and Dangerous
 Lynd, Straughton; & Lynd, Alice (Eds.) (1995). Nonviolence in America: A Documentary History. Maryknoll, New York: Orbis Books.
 Zinn, Howard – A People's History of the United States

External links
 Fire and Faith: The Catonsville Nine File
 DVD on the Catonsville Nine
 A retreat center that honors the inspiration of Br. David Darst, one of the Catonsville Nine

Catonsville, Maryland
Catholic Church in Maryland
Roman Catholic activists
American anti–Vietnam War activists
Draft-card burning
Quantified groups of defendants
Protests in Maryland